Jowshan Rural District is a rural district (dehestan) in Golbaf District, Kerman County, Kerman Province, Iran. At the 2006 census, its population was 2,583, in 597 families. The rural district has 15 villages.

References 

Rural Districts of Kerman Province
Kerman County